Hampton W. Wall (November 10, 1831–April 16, 1898) was an American politician and businessman.

Wall was born on a farm near Staunton, Illinois. He went to the public schools. Wall was a banker and lived in Staunton, Illinois with his wife and family. He served on the Macoupin County Board of Supervisors and as a justice of the peace. Wall served in the Illinois House of Representatives from 1877 to 1881. Wall then served in the Illinois Senate from 1893 to 1897 and was a Democrat. Wall was murdered by a tenant in Staunton, Illinois with a firearm.

Notes

External links

1831 births
1898 deaths
People from Staunton, Illinois
Businesspeople from Illinois
County board members in Illinois
Democratic Party members of the Illinois House of Representatives
Democratic Party Illinois state senators
People murdered in Illinois
Male murder victims
Deaths by firearm in Illinois
19th-century American politicians
19th-century American businesspeople